Marko Roškar (born 21 October 1992) is a Slovenian football defender.

References

External links
NZS profile 

1992 births
Living people
People from Ptuj
Slovenian footballers
Association football defenders
NK Drava Ptuj players
NK IB 1975 Ljubljana players
NK Triglav Kranj players
NK Zavrč players
NK Drava Ptuj (2004) players
NK Aluminij players
NK Bravo players
Slovenian PrvaLiga players
Slovenian Second League players
Slovenia youth international footballers
Slovenia under-21 international footballers